Midtbygda or Meråker is the administrative centre of the municipality of Meråker in Trøndelag county, Norway. Midtbygda is located along the Stjørdalselva river and the European route E14 highway. It is served by Meråker Station, which is a railway station located along the Meråker Line.

References

Villages in Trøndelag
Meråker